Khama Worthy (born October 15, 1986) is an American retired mixed martial artist who competed in the Lightweight division. A professional since 2012, he has fought in the Ultimate Fighting Championship (UFC), King of the Cage and CES MMA.

Background
Born and raised in Pittsburgh, Pennsylvania, Worthy began training in MMA at the age of 20.

Mixed martial arts career

Early career
Worthy competed as an amateur from 2009 until 2011, amassing a record of 8-2. Starting out his professional career in 2012, Worthy fought mostly for various organizations throughout the American Northeast. Amassing a record of 14-6 before entering the UFC, Worthy fought for the SOFC Featherweight championship against fellow UFC fighter, Billy Quarantillo, and won the 247 Lightweight Championship.

Ultimate Fighting Championship
Worthy made his UFC debut as a late replacement for Clay Collard against Devonte Smith on August 17, 2019 at UFC 241. He won the fight via technical knockout in round one. This win earned him the Performance of the Night award.

Worthy faced Luis Peña on June 27, 2020 at UFC on ESPN: Poirier vs. Hooker. He won the fight via a guillotine choke in round three.

A lightweight bout between Khama Worthy and Ottman Azaitar was previously scheduled to take place at UFC 249. However, the event was cancelled in early April due to the COVID-19 pandemic. The pairing was then rescheduled to UFC Fight Night: Overeem vs. Sakai. In turn, the pair was removed from that event due to undisclosed reasons and moved to UFC Fight Night: Waterson vs. Hill Worthy lost the fight via technical knockout in the first round.

Worthy faced Jamie Mullarkey on March 27, 2021 at UFC 260. He lost the fight via knockout in round one.

Worthy faced Jai Herbert on October 23, 2021 at UFC Fight Night 196. He lost the fight via technical knockout in round one.

On November 14, 2021, it was announced Worthy was released by UFC.

Post-UFC career
After being released from the UFC, Worthy made his return to 247 Fighting Championship against Jeremiah Scott at 247 FC: Brawl in the Burgh 10 on February 5, 2022. He won the bout via TKO in the first round.

Worthy faced Kaheem Murray on April 16, 2022 at  247 FC: Brawl in the Burgh 11. He won the bout via knockout in the first round.

After losing to Trevor Peek via first round knockout on August 13, 2022 at Aries Fight Series: AMPD, Worthy won a majority decision victory over Josh Rohler on October 22, 2022 at 247 FC: Brawl in the Burgh 14. He retired from MMA right after the bout.

Personal life
Khama and his fiance have a daughter, born 2017.

Championships and accomplishments

Mixed martial arts
247 Fighting Championship
247 Lightweight Champion
One successful title defense
Ultimate Fighting Championship
Performance of the Night (One time)

Mixed martial arts record

|-
|Win
|align=center|19–10
|Josh Rohler
|Decision (majority)
|247 FC: Brawl in the Burgh 14
|
|align=center|3
|align=center|5:00
|Washington, Pennsylvania, United States
|
|-
|Loss
|align=center|18–10
|Trevor Peek
|KO (punch)
|Aries Fight Series: AMPD
|
|align=center|1
|align=center|4:44
|Nashville, Tennessee, United States
|
|-
| Win
| align=center|18–9
| Kaheem Murray
| KO (punch)
| 247 FC: Brawl in the Burgh 11
| 
| align=center|1
| align=center|1:52	
| Monroeville, Pennsylvania, United States
|
|-
| Win
| align=center|17–9
| Jeremiah Scott
| TKO (strikes)
| 247 FC: Brawl in the Burgh 10
| 
| align=center|1
| align=center|2:21
| Monroeville, Pennsylvania, United States
|
|-
| Loss
| align=center|16–9
| Jai Herbert
| TKO (punches)
| UFC Fight Night: Costa vs. Vettori
| 
| align=center|1
| align=center|2:47
| Las Vegas, Nevada, United States
|
|-
| Loss
| align=center|16–8
|Jamie Mullarkey
|KO (punches)
|UFC 260
|
|align=center|1
|align=center|0:46
|Las Vegas, Nevada, United States
|
|-
| Loss
| align=center|16–7
|Ottman Azaitar
| TKO (punches)
| UFC Fight Night: Waterson vs. Hill
| 
| align=center|1
| align=center|1:33
| Las Vegas, Nevada, United States
|
|-
| Win
| align=center|16–6
|Luis Peña
|Submission (guillotine choke)
|UFC on ESPN: Poirier vs. Hooker
|
|align=center|3
|align=center|2:53
|Las Vegas, Nevada, United States
|
|-
| Win
| align=center|15–6
|Devonte Smith
|TKO (punches)
|UFC 241 
|
|align=center|1
|align=center|4:15
|Anaheim, California, United States
|
|-
| Win
| align=center|14–6
| Adam Ward
| KO (punches)
| 247 FC: Brawl In The Burgh
| 
| align=center|3
| align=center|0:13
| Canonsburg, Pennsylvania, United States
|
|-
| Win
| align=center|13–6
| Joey Munoz
| Decision (unanimous)
| 247 FC: Steeltown Throwdown
| 
| align=center| 3
| align=center| 5:00
| Canonsburg, Pennsylvania, United States
|
|-
| Win
| align=center| 12–6
| Tim Cho	
| Submission (rear-naked choke)
|Pinnacle FC: Pinnacle Fighting Championships 18
|
|align=center|2
|align=center|0:18
|Pittsburgh, Pennsylvania, United States
|
|-
| Win
| align=center| 11–6
| Brady Hovermale
| TKO (punches)
|Made Men Promotions: Rivers Rumble MMA
|
|align=center|3
|align=center|4:34
|Pittsburgh, Pennsylvania, United States
|
|-
| Win
| align=center| 10–6
| Michael Roberts
| Decision (unanimous)
| Pinnacle FC: Pinnacle Fighting Championships 16
| 
| align=center| 3
| align=center| 5:00
| Canonsburg, Pennsylvania, United States
| 
|-
| Loss
| align=center| 9–6
| Kyle Nelson
| KO (punch)
| BTC 1: Genesis
| 
| align=center| 1
| align=center| 1:03
| Toronto, Ontario, Canada
| 
|-
| Loss
| align=center| 9–5
| Anthony Retic
| KO (punches)
| KOTC: Destructive Intent
| 
| align=center| 1
| align=center| 1:06
| Washington, Pennsylvania, United States
| 
|-
| Win
| align=center| 9–4
| Adrian Vilaca
| Submission (rear-naked choke)
| GOTC MMA 21
| 
| align=center| 2
| align=center| 4:48
| Pittsburgh, Pennsylvania, United States
|
|-
| Win
| align=center| 8–4
| Antonio Castillo Jr.
| TKO (punches)
| Pinnacle FC: Pittsburgh Challenge Series 12
| 
| align=center| 3
| align=center| 0:14
| Cheswick, Pennsylvania, United States
|
|-
| Loss
| align=center|7–4
| Matt Bessette
| KO (punch)
| CES MMA 29
| 
| align=center|2
| align=center|2:42
| Lincoln, Rhode Island, United States
|
|-
| Loss
| align=center|7–3
| Billy Quarantillo
| TKO
| SOFC: Strike Off 4
| 
| align=center|2
| align=center|0:10
| Annandale, Virginia, United States
|
|-
| Win
| align=center|7–2
| Matt DiMarcantonio
| TKO (punches)
| Pinnacle FC: Pittsburgh Challenge Series 9
| 
| align=center|1
| align=center|4:49
| Canonsburg, Pennsylvania, United States
|
|-
| Win
| align=center|6–2
| Anthony Morgan
| TKO (punches)
| Pinnacle FC: Pittsburgh Challenge Series 7
| 
| align=center|2
| align=center|4:52
| Pittsburgh, Pennsylvania, United States
|
|-
| Win
| align=center| 5–2
| Jacob Butler
| KO (punch)
| Pinnacle FC: Pittsburgh Challenge Series 6
| 
| align=center|1
| align=center|0:26
| Pittsburgh, Pennsylvania, United States
| 
|-
| Win
| align=center| 4–2
| Reggie Merriweather
| Decision (unanimous)
| Pinnacle FC: Pittsburgh Challenge Series 5
|
| align=center| 3
| align=center| 5:00
|Canonsburg, Pennsylvania, United States
|
|-
| Win
| align=center| 3–2
| Francis Healy
| TKO (punches)
| Pinnacle FC: Pittsburgh Challenge Series 3
| 
| align=center| 2
| align=center| 0:57
| Canonsburg, Pennsylvania, United States
|
|-
| Win
| align=center| 2–2
| Jason Willett
| Decision (unanimous)
| Pinnacle FC: Pittsburgh Challenge Series 2
| 
| align=center| 3
| align=center| 5:00
| Canonsburg, Pennsylvania, United States
| 
|-
| Loss
| align=center| 1–2
| Paul Felder
|TKO (punches)
|Pinnacle FC: Pittsburgh Challenge Series 1
|
|align=center| 1
|align=center| 1:10
|Canonsburg, Pennsylvania, United States
| 
|-
| Win
| align=center| 1–1
| Victer Crenshaw
| TKO (Doctor Stoppage) 
| NAAFS: Caged Fury 18
| 
| align=center| 3
| align=center| 3:46
| Charleston, West Virginia, United States
|
|-
| Loss
| align=center| 0–1
| George Comer
| Submission (rear-naked choke)
| NAAFS: Fight Night in the Flats 8
| 
| align=center| 2
| align=center| 3:58
| Cleveland, Ohio, United States
|

See also 
 List of male mixed martial artists

References

External links 
  
 

1986 births
Living people
American male mixed martial artists
Lightweight mixed martial artists
Mixed martial artists utilizing Brazilian jiu-jitsu
Sportspeople from Pittsburgh
Mixed martial artists from Pennsylvania
Ultimate Fighting Championship male fighters
American practitioners of Brazilian jiu-jitsu